Jean-Paul Valley Jr. is an antihero appearing in American comic books published by DC Comics. The character was created by Denny O'Neil, Joe Quesada, and Peter Milligan, and debuted in Batman: Sword of Azrael #1 (October 1992) as an ally of the superhero Batman, after which he would go on to make appearances in several Batman titles. He is the first character to assume the identity of Azrael, a member of a group of assassins who were created by the Order of St. Dumas to bring justice to Gotham City. He is also the second character to take the Batman name for a short time during the Knightfall storyline, known to be a more brutal incarnation.

In the DC Universe, Jean-Paul Valley Jr. is a member of a long family line of assassin-enforcers of the Order of St. Dumas, which was once a fraction of the Knights Templar and as a child, was artificially raised and brainwashed by the Order through a method only known as "The System", causing him to develop split personality between his Jean-Paul identity and Azrael, the former personality more violent and dangerous; believing itself to be an incarnation of the actual angel Azrael. As an adult, he would learn of his heritage through his father, the Azrael before him. Over time, Valley would overcome his brainwashing and fight alongside Batman and his associates. The character is typically portrayed as a vigilante with good intentions, though he and Batman have also been at odds because the Order brainwashed Valley and its effects on his mental state.

After the events of  Flashpoint, a new main incarnation of Jean-Paul Valley would appear during Batman and Robin Eternal with a similar history to his previous counterpart although he is instead a clone of Jean-Paul Valley Sr. molded by Batman villain, Mother, into the ways of the Order of St. Dumas. The character once again realizes the corruptive ways of the Order and defects from them thanks to the intervention of Red Hood, Red Robin, and Dick Grayson. The character later becomes a member of the Batman Family, most notably under the Gotham Knights team led by both Batman and Batwoman. He would also join Justice League Odyssey.

Publication history

The character first appeared in the 1992 four-issue miniseries Batman: Sword of Azrael as Jean-Paul Valley.

He then became a supporting character in the monthly Batman titles, eventually taking over the role of Batman through the "Knightfall", "Knightquest", and "KnightsEnd" story arcs. One of the creators, Denny O'Neil, admitted to having difficulties with Azrael's transition from villain to hero: "If I'd known he was to become a monthly character, I might have set him up differently. The problem is that I had to turn a bad guy into a real hero, not just an anti-hero or lead. It's possible to do that, but it's difficult to retain the original characterization. You almost have to change his personality".

O'Neil characterized Azrael as contrasting to Batman: "Bruce is very aware of what he is and how that contributes to what he does. He is not moved by internal or external forces that he doesn’t already understand. Jean-Paul, on the other hand, has virtually no idea who he really is. He is, in the worst possible way, ignorant. Think about it: he had a rotten childhood he can barely remember; conversely, Bruce remembers his childhood, which was, up until that one critical moment, a very happy and privileged one – all too well. So they are at extreme opposite ends of the psychological spectrum."

The subsequent Azrael series, chronicling Valley's battles against the Order of St. Dumas, ran for 100 issues between 1995 and 2003. O'Neil modeled the series on Arthurian legends, comparing Azrael's quest to discover the truth about himself to the Holy Grail. Starting with issue #47, it was retitled to Azrael: Agent of the Bat in an attempt to boost sales by tying the series in with the rest of the Batman mythos, including Azrael as part of the team of Batman, Robin, and the new Batgirl. Eventually, the character was killed off in the 100th issue of his series and would only make a handful of appearances in flashbacks and the Blackest Night storyline.

Over a decade later, a new incarnation of the character would emerge from Batman and Robin Eternal #10 in February 2016. The character would become a recurring character in several arcs of the Detective Comics title as part of the Gotham Knights team led by both Batman and Batwoman. In November 2018, Valley would also appear as a member of an incarnation of the Justice League team known as the Justice League Odyssey until its end in December 2020.

As part of the character's 30th anniversary, Valley is one of the characters featured in the Batman: Urban Legends title in late 2021 and early 2022.

Fictional character biography
Jean-Paul Valley, a university graduate student of computer science in Gotham City, is unaware that he is the latest in a line of assassin-enforcers for "The Sacred Order of Saint Dumas", a sinister religious secret society. For most of his life, he has been brainwashed by The System, a deep level of psychological conditioning.

Valley only learned of his new status upon the death of his father, who was also his predecessor, at which time his conditioning was activated and he was called upon to take up the mantle of Azrael. When he was sent by the Order to kill weapons dealer Carleton Leah, a rogue member of the Order who turned against the others and killed Valley's father, he crossed paths with Batman, who had been investigating the death. He worked with Alfred Pennyworth to find Leah after he had captured Bruce Wayne, using the Batman costume to kill the other Order members. Valley worked with Alfred, demonstrating a detective's intuition in tracking LeHah's movements and later risking himself to rescue Bruce despite his traditional mission of vengeance. In doing so, he was shown the error of his ways and decided to fight alongside Batman against the criminals of Gotham, rejecting his "birthright" and seeking Batman's help in breaking his conditioning to forge his destiny.

His name is not revealed to Alfred and Bruce until the end of the story, at which point he claims it also was his father's name (a later storyline in his solo series stated his father's name to be Ludovic Valley, however).

Valley is given a job as a security guard at WayneTech headquarters, and also becomes an apprentice crimefighter alongside Batman and Robin, learning basic detective work.

Valley plays a pivotal role in the Knightfall story arc (1993–1994), in which he stands in as Batman after Bruce Wayne is defeated and paralyzed at the hands of Bane. He decides that Bruce's tactics as Batman are obsolete and believes that he must fight criminals on their terms which makes him far more brutal and merciless, often even showing little regard for innocent bystanders. Against Bruce Wayne's orders, Valley fights and defeats Bane, wearing enhanced battle armor he designed and built under the influence of the System after he was narrowly defeated by Bane in their first confrontation. His performance as Batman is influenced by his Azrael conditioning. He grows increasingly violent and delusional, allowing the mass murderer Abattoir to fall to his death, thereby also allowing one of Abattoir's still-living hostages to die. Valley also has control problems with Tim Drake's partnership, emphasized when Valley almost strangles him to death and bans him from the Batcave. He seals off the Batcave from Wayne Manor and the Drake property and eschews working with Commissioner Gordon and the Gotham police. Valley also suffers from continuous hallucinations of both his father and St. Dumas who tell him that he is the real Batman and that he must avenge his father's death (having convinced himself that Leah was just the man who instigated his father's death while one of the man's former henchmen pulled the trigger).

Initially, Wayne is impressed enough with Valley's results to let him remain Batman, but when Drake tells Wayne of Abattoir's death, he resolves to reclaim the Batman mantle. With his back repaired thanks to the sacrifice of psychic healer Doctor Shondra Kinsolving, and his fighting instincts rehabilitated after lessons with Lady Shiva, Wayne goes after Valley to reclaim his identity. After a prolonged battle that stretches from a Gotham penthouse to a major bridge before culminating in a showdown in the Batcave, Bruce tricks Valley into removing his armor, excluding his helmet (with night-vision lenses engaged), and exposes him to bright sunlight - the shock snaps Valley out of his delusional state. Acknowledging Bruce Wayne as the true Batman, Valley apologizes and asks for his forgiveness, which Bruce accepts, recognizing his role in Valley's descent into madness during his time as Batman, but tells Valley to leave Wayne Manor immediately.

Valley lives among the homeless population of Gotham for several weeks, befriending an alcoholic former psychiatrist named Brian Bryan.

Valley is then sought out by Bruce Wayne, who feels responsible for his mental breakdown after attaining and losing the mantle of Batman. Bruce grants him a small fortune in money, information on the Order of St. Dumas' whereabouts, and resources to explore his origins. Along with Bryan, he discovers the evil conspiracies within the order of St. Dumas, and they help a nun named Sister Lily escape. With the help of Ra's al Ghul, Valley discovers that he is a genetically engineered test tube baby, and his genes have been spliced with those of animals.

He returns to Gotham for several crossover events, including Underworld Unleashed, Contagion, Legacy, and Cataclysm. He also discovers that his father's killer, Carlton Leah, is still alive. Valley attempts to regain Batman's trust after the events of the KnightsEnd arc. Batman, who feels responsible for Valley, especially after realizing that he gave him very little training and support, decides to give Azrael missions to carry out as a test to prove himself. The first of these missions is to defeat a resurfaced Bane, but it is not until Azrael saves the lives of a group of U.S. Senators (one of which tries to plead to Congress for the funds to rebuild Gotham City after its devastating earthquake) that Batman begins to fully trust him again. Before those events, Batman sent Azrael after Nicholas Scratch, who was planning to kill another Senator who also wanted federal money to save Gotham City. While pursuing Scratch, Azrael was framed for the Senator's murder after he was strangled to death moments before Azrael arrived to save him.

After being framed, Azrael is given a new costume designed by Batman and uses it for a time, especially during the No Man's Land story arc. Azrael helps Batman maintain a chaotic Gotham City, often with the assistance of the new Batgirl and protects Leslie Thompkins' medical clinic inside of No Man's Land. After foiling Scratch's plan of framing him for murder, Azrael returns to his original costume and battles hallucinations that represent both his father and St. Dumas himself. Toward the end of the series, Azrael is plagued by supernatural occurrences in the form of possible miracles.

Azrael is seemingly killed in the series' final issue, shot with two specially-coated bullets while battling Scratch and Leah. Scratch is arrested, and Leah falls into the river with Azrael. However, Azrael's body is never recovered, and his death went unconfirmed for several years. In Booster Gold (vol. 2) #10, a note can be seen written on time traveler Rip Hunter's chalkboard reading "Jean-Paul Valley Lives!" In the following issue, another note says, "Azrael comes and goes". Azrael appears in Blackest Night #4 as an undead member of the Black Lantern Corps, although at first it had not been confirmed whether it was Jean-Paul Valley or another Azrael (such as Ludovic Valley, who died in Gotham City). The index section of the Blackest Night tabloid later indicated that it was in fact Jean-Paul.

Jean-Paul Valley makes a cameo at Batman's funeral service in Neil Gaiman's 2009 story Batman: Whatever Happened to the Caped Crusader? He is seen stepping up to deliver his version of Batman's death as a background event, but his story is unseen and he has no lines. The story is metaphysical in nature, not affecting the overall status of the canon or Azrael's fate.

The New 52 

In The New 52 (a reboot of  DC's continuity), Jean-Paul Valley reappeared as Azrael in an arc of Batman & Robin: Eternal. His design was updated, with his main weapon being his sword rather than gauntlets (although he was later shown to still possess the gauntlet blades). His character, however, was essentially the same, working as an enforcer for the Order of St. Dumas. In the comic, he defeated Bane and eventually turned on his handler and the Order to assist Red Hood and Tim Drake. This marked the first proper appearance of a living Jean-Paul Valley in the DCU in over a dozen years, with previous appearances relegated to either minimal cameos or the aforementioned Black Lantern revival of the character.

Grayson: Spyral's End 
Azrael would make an appearance in the Grayson title in one of its annual issues as one of the few people to have encountered Agent 37 during their work, particularly in an incident where both Azrael and Agent 37 team up to stop the Order of St. Dumas from getting access to a mystical artifact able to have a direct communication line to people in Heaven. Azrael is revealed to have connections to the people of Khortamor, residing in a small village in the fictional nation known as Kahndaq. As Azrael and others are brought together by a "Jim Corrigan" looking to figure out the identity of Agent 37, Azrael's story along with others (John Constantine, Harley Quinn, and Simon Baz) allows them all to figure out his identity as Dick Grayson due to his personality. Corrigan is then revealed to be a disguised Dick Grayson using a technology called "Hypnos" and wipes their memory by using nanites he secretly gave to them during the meeting to preserve his secret.

DC Rebirth 
In 2016, DC Comics would have a re-launch coined DC Rebirth of its entire line of ongoing monthly superhero comics, the initiative aiming to restore the DC Universe and have more of its story elements and characters more similar to their Pre-Flashpoint portrayals. Jean-Paul Valley's appearances would be regulated to the Detective Comics ongoing title starting with issue #934, making a few cameo appearances before ore joining the roster fully in issue #943 as a reoccurring character in the Gotham Knights team, a group of Bat-Family members led by Batman and Batwoman with a stricter adherence.

"Batman: Detective Comics: Deus Ex Machina (Rebirth)" 
In the "Deus Ex Machina" storyline, one of Valley's former associates, Nomoz, appears to him on the verge of death and the team takes him to the Belfry to treat the injured creature. Azrael explains to Batwoman, Orphan, Clayface, and Batwing his past, noting that Nomoz was the person responsible in the Order of St. Dumas for brutally training him in preparation for his eventual role as the Order's Azrael. In the present time, Nomoz had since been systematically targeted by a former associate of the Order who believed in guiding the order in a new direction and activates a powerful AI, Ascalon, that is dispatched to assassinate key members of the St. Dumas order. When the Gotham Knights team along with Zatanna encounter Ascalon, he confuses Jean-Paul for himself and reasserts his influence on Valley. Batwing would also reveal that Ascalon was formerly the AI present in the Suit of Sorrows responsible for the "programming" of Azrael, having studied it since Valley allowed him access to the Suit of Sorrows. Valley's encounter with Ascalon would reassert his old "programming" causing him to slowly regress to his original Azrael personality as the "System", the neurological programming in his mind overcomes him. In his former persona, Valley battles both Batwoman and Orphan while he battles the influence of the System and Ascalon. He is defeated due to the timely intervention of Zatanna and is placed in a different suit with a new guiding AI based on Batman's best personality traits to counter Ascalon's influence.

Using a similar tactic, Batwing and Azrael would battle Ascalon once more to upload the same AI into the robotic entity, Nomoz sacrificing himself in the process. With the Batman AI uploaded into Ascalon, Zatanna appears with a magical artifact, the Sphere of Gnosis, able to answer the questions of those who wield it. Ascalon experiences a revelation as his human aspect becomes real and identifies Jean-Paul as his "brother".  Sympathizing Batman's grief over the loss of Tim Drake, he reveals to him he is alive before disappearing. In the aftermath, Valley recovers from his wounds and speaks to Batman about wiping out Ascalon's influence from his Azrael suit and the idea of having a Batman AI guide him. The end of the story would reveal the rogue member of the Order to be Valley's father, Jean-Paul Valley Sr. who is collaborating with Ra's al Ghul.

"Detective Comics: Batman Eternal" 

After Batwoman invited Azrael and Batwing to join her colony, they agree in hopes to reshape the Colony.

DC Universe (2017 - )

Justice League Odyssey (2018) 
Azrael joined the new Justice League team Justice League Odyssey in 2018.

Powers, abilities, and resources 
Unlike other members of the Batman Family, Azrael is one of the few members who possess explicit superpowers, having been physically and psychologically programmed to be a nearly perfect warrior and assassin by scientists of St. Dumas. As such, he possesses enhanced physical attributes such as superhuman strength, speed, and agility beyond normal human levels. Prior to Flashpoint, these abilities originated from his slightly altered physiology, his DNA having been grafted with animal DNA to enhance his abilities while after Flashpoint, these abilities originate simply from genetic alternation. Post-Flashpoint, Azrael also possesses limited empathic abilities, able to induce painful visions to others via touch, which is often used to leave his foes in a catatonic state. He refers to this ability as "Wrath of God". Azrael is also a highly trained assassin, being an expert in both hand-to-hand combat and with a sword, with this being due to form a psychological conditioning and training referred to as "The System" performed by Nomoz. His combat skills make him competent enough to either match or defeat opponents such as Bane, Deathstroke, Batman, Batwoman, and Cassandra Cain.

Azrael does, however, possess several weaknesses: due to the mental conditioning from The System, Valley is only able to access his powers while suited up and his normal personality is suppressed for a more violent one. Over time, Azrael has learned for the two personalities co-exist dependent on continuity. and call upon his abilities and skills. The System also makes his mental state vulnerable, with St. Dumas's technology able to influence and override his personality at times. Pre-Flashpoint, his mental state and physiology were also damaged from exposure to toxic chemicals, which heighten his enhanced abilities but furthered his mental illness and affected his physiology, slowly killing him.

Equipment
Originally, the Azrael costume worn by Jean-Paul Valley was considered of a red and gold Kevlar armor resistant to bullets. This armor also is outfitted with wrist gauntlets with retractable blades that can be engulfed in flames. After becoming an "Agent of the Bat", he dons silver and black armor with a red cape and a stylized red bat symbol on the chest. Later on, he dons red armor with golden gauntlets, boots, shoulder pads, and a blue cape. He sometimes carries a flaming sword, and also uses two retractable daggers hidden in the gauntlets of his costume that can be charged with thermal energy to increase their destructive power. In Batman: The Ultimate Guide to the Dark Knight, Scott Beatty implied that Azrael's changing costumes were reflections of the changes in Azrael's life from an agent of St. Dumas to an agent of Batman to his own man.

His Post-Flashpoint costume is consistent with his original pre-Flashpoint version although instead of being Kevlar, it is a special suit stylized after a medieval crusader called the "Suit of Sorrows", a special armor with an advanced AI (called Ascalon) that pinpoints the weakness within an opponent and enhances his original Azrael personality, making him a more dangerous fighter. After the events of Deus Ex Machina, Valley has a new AI built based on Batman's best personality attributes, enabling him to battle against the dogma of St. Dumas without compromising his mental state. His Post-Flashpoint incarnation also wields a special flaming sword named Murasame.

Other versions
 Jean-Paul Valley appears in Sean Murphy's Batman: Curse of the White Knight as the main antagonist. In the story, he is a former United States Army veteran who has been diagnosed with terminal cancer. The Joker appeared to him, claiming that God had a mission for him. He then recruited two of his former squadmates and was hired by Ruth, a woman who served Gotham's Elites. With the Elites' backing, Valley went on a rampage through Gotham City and murdered both James Gordon and Batman's entire rogue gallery.
 The one-shot "Dark Multiverse: Knightfall" depicts a world where Jean-Paul Valley as Batman defeats and critically wounds Bruce Wayne, kills Gotham's villains and keeps Bruce Wayne alive as a head and torso linked to a life support system inside of Wayne Tower. Valley annually visits Bruce to receive his approval of Valley's more extreme methods. Although the rest of the world collapses due to some sort of apocalyptic event, Gotham City still stands as Valley's regime lasts for thirty years. Valley increasingly becomes more mentally unstable due to his being addicted to Venom. Bane's son and Lady Shiva rescue Wayne, providing him with a new nanotech body. Wayne seemingly kills his former successor, revealing that his years of isolation and torment have driven him to a point where he concludes that he can only rely on himself, then kills both Shiva and her son and strings Azrael up on a bat sigil in the style of a crucifixion.
 Jean-Paul Valley makes his DC Animated Universe debut on Batman: The Adventures Continue #7, a continuation of Batman: The Animated Series. While chasing Catwoman, Batman encounters Azrael. Azrael is in Gotham to retrieve the Shawl of Magdalene, which was stolen from his religious order, the Order of Saint Dumas. He joins forces with the Dark Knight to retrieve it.

In other media

Video games
 The Jean-Paul Valley version of Azrael appears as an assist character in Scribblenauts Unmasked: A DC Comics Adventure.
 The PlayStation 3 edition of Batman: Arkham Origins features the Knightfall DLC pack, which includes an alternate Batman costume based on Jean-Paul Valley's Batsuit, as well as challenge maps based on Batman: Knightfall.

Lego 

 The Jean-Paul Valley version of Azrael is a playable character in the Nintendo DS version of Lego Batman: The Videogame, unlocked after achieving "True Hero" on all levels. In the other versions, the player can unlock special LEGO pieces to build Azrael in the character creation feature.
 The Jean-Paul Valley version of Batman appears as a playable character in Lego Batman 3: Beyond Gotham, via the 75th Anniversary DLC pack.

Collected editions
 Batman: Contagion (Azrael #15)
 Batman: No Man's Land Vol. 1 (Azrael: Agent of the Bat #51-55)
 Batman: No Man's Land Vol. 2 (Azrael: Agent of the Bat #56)
 Batman: No Man's Land Vol. 3 (Azrael: Agent of the Bat #58)
 Batman: No Man's Land Vol. 4 (Azrael: Agent of the Bat #59-61)
 Batman: Sword of Azrael (#1-4) [1993] - 
 Knightfall

References

External links
 Azrael (Jean-Paul Valley) at the DC Database Project
 
 

DC Comics supervillains
1992 comics debuts
Alternative versions of Batman
Batman characters
Comics characters introduced in 1992
DC Comics metahumans
DC Comics characters with superhuman strength
DC Comics characters who can move at superhuman speeds
DC Comics characters who have mental powers
DC Comics martial artists
DC Comics male superheroes
DC Comics male supervillains
Fictional characters with dissociative identity disorder
Fictional assassins in comics
Fictional blade and dart throwers
Fictional genetically engineered characters
Fictional swordfighters in comics
Characters created by Dennis O'Neil
Characters created by Joe Quesada
Fictional knights
Vigilante characters in comics
Fictional empaths
Fictional security guards